Oliva dactyliola is a species of sea snail, a marine gastropod mollusk in the family Olividae, the olives.

Description
The length of the shell attains 26.6 mm.

Distribution
This marine species occurs from the Philippines and Indonesia to the Fijis and the Solomon Islands.

References

 Vervaet F.L.J. (2018). The living Olividae species as described by Pierre-Louis Duclos. Vita Malacologica. 17: 1-111

dactyliola
Gastropods described in 1840